Anaqah is a sub-district located in Sanhan and Bani Bahlul District, Sana'a Governorate, Yemen. Anaqah had a population of 1365 according to the 2004 census.

References 

Sub-districts in Sanhan and Bani Bahlul District